Rhinoclavis is a genus of sea snails, marine gastropod molluscs in the family Cerithiidae, the ceriths.

Occurrence
Species in this genus occur throughout the Indo-Pacific, the Marshall Islands, the Solomon Islands, the Philippines, Australia and the Gulf of Aqaba. These deposit-feeding gastropods can be found in clearer shallow water in coral reefs, preferring sandy to muddy bottoms.

Species
According to the World Register of Marine Species (WORMS), Rhinoclavis consists of the following subgenera and species:
 Rhinoclavis alexandri (Tomlin, 1923)
 Rhinoclavis pilsbryi (Kuroda & Habe, 1961)
 Rhinoclavis taniae Cecalupo, 2008
 Rhinoclavis (Longicerithium) Houbrick, 1978 
 Rhinoclavis (Longicerithium) longicaudatum  (A. Adams & Reeve, 1850) 
 Rhinoclavis (Proclava)  Thiele, 1929 
 Rhinoclavis (Proclava) kochi  (Philippi, 1848) 
 Rhinoclavis (Proclava) sordidula (Gould, 1849) 
 Rhinoclavis (Rhinoclavis) Swainson, 1840 
 Rhinoclavis (Rhinoclavis) articulata  (A. Adams & Reeve, 1850) 
 Rhinoclavis (Rhinoclavis) aspera (Linnaeus, 1758) 
 Rhinoclavis (Rhinoclavis) bituberculata (G.B. Sowerby II, 1866) 
 Rhinoclavis (Rhinoclavis) brettinghami Cernohorsky, 1974 
 Rhinoclavis (Rhinoclavis) diadema  Houbrick, 1978 
 Rhinoclavis (Rhinoclavis) fasciata (Bruguière, 1792) 
 Rhinoclavis (Rhinoclavis) sinensis  (Gmelin, 1791) 
 Rhinoclavis (Rhinoclavis) vertagus  (Linnaeus, 1767) 
Species brought into synonymy
 Rhinoclavis aluco (Linnaeus, 1758): synonym of Pseudovertagus aluco (Linnaeus, 1758)
 Rhinoclavis articulata (A. Adams & Reeve, 1850): synonym of Rhinoclavis (Rhinoclavis) articulata (A. Adams & Reeve, 1850)
 Rhinoclavis asper: synonym of Rhinoclavis (Rhinoclavis) aspera (Linnaeus, 1758)
 Rhinoclavis aspera (Linnaeus, 1758): synonym of Rhinoclavis (Rhinoclavis) aspera (Linnaeus, 1758)
 Rhinoclavis bituberculata (G.B. Sowerby II, 1866): synonym of Rhinoclavis (Rhinoclavis) bituberculata (G.B. Sowerby II, 1866)
 Rhinoclavis brettinghami Cernohorsky, 1974: synonym of Rhinoclavis (Rhinoclavis) brettinghami Cernohorsky, 1974
 Rhinoclavis diadema Houbrick, 1978: synonym of Rhinoclavis (Rhinoclavis) diadema Houbrick, 1978
 Rhinoclavis fasciata (Bruguière, 1792): synonym of Rhinoclavis (Rhinoclavis) fasciata (Bruguière, 1792)
 Rhinoclavis mountfordae Cotton, 1964: synonym of Rhinoclavis (Rhinoclavis) fasciata (Bruguière, 1792)
 Rhinoclavis nobilis (Reeve, 1855): synonym of Pseudovertagus nobilis (Reeve, 1855)
 Rhinoclavis obeliscus (Bruguière, 1792): synonym of Rhinoclavis (Rhinoclavis) sinensis (Gmelin, 1791)
 Rhinoclavis pulchra (A. Adams in G.B. Sowerby II, 1855): synonym of Rhinoclavis (Rhinoclavis) brettinghami Cernohorsky, 1974
 Rhinoclavis sordidula (Gould, 1849): synonym of Rhinoclavis (Proclava) sordidula (Gould, 1849)

References

Further reading
 Houbrick, R.S. 1978. The family Cerithiidae in the Indo-Pacific. Part 1. The genera Rhinoclavis, Pseudovertagus  and Clavocerithium. Monographs of Marine Mollusca 1:1–130. The names mentioned can be found at OBIS: Indo Pacific Molluscan database
 Vaught, K.C. (1989). A classification of the living Mollusca. American Malacologists: Melbourne, FL (USA). . XII, 195 pp
 Gofas, S.; Le Renard, J.; Bouchet, P. (2001). Mollusca, in: Costello, M.J. et al. (Ed.) (2001). European register of marine species: a check-list of the marine species in Europe and a bibliography of guides to their identification. Collection Patrimoines Naturels, 50: pp. 180–213

External links
 Photos : Natural History Museum Rotterdam – Cerithiidae

Cerithiidae